La Llera is one of 13 parishes (administrative divisions) in the Colunga municipality, within the province and autonomous community of Asturias, in northern Spain. 

The population is 8 according to the INE in 2007.

References

Parishes in Colunga